Glucocorticoid modulatory element-binding protein 2 is a protein that in humans is encoded by the GMEB2 gene.

This gene is a member of KDWK gene family. The product of this gene associates with GMEB1 protein, and the complex is essential for parvovirus DNA replication. Study of rat homolog implicates the role of this gene in modulation of transactivation by the glucocorticoid receptor bound to glucocorticoid response elements. This gene appears to use multiple polyadenylation sites.

References

Further reading